FC Shakhtar-2 Donetsk was a Ukrainian reserve football team based in Donetsk, Ukraine.

History

The club was formed in 1992. It was preceded by Shakhter-D Donetsk (where D stood for double) which since 1949 participated in the Soviet football championship for reserve teams. With the fall of the Soviet Union the team was preserved, reorganized as Shkhtar-2 Donetsk and was admitted to the 1992 Ukrainian First League. Until 1994 the team represented the city of Kostiantynivka and in 1992–1994 played under the name of Metalurh Kostiantynivka. The team played at Avtosklo Stadium.

In 1994-95 the team carried name of Garant Donetsk, but later changed back to Shakhtar-2. The team represented the city of Komsomolske, Donetsk Oblast playing at Metalurh Stadium.

In 1995-96 the team played at Shakhtar Stadium in Donetsk and at another Shakhtar Stadium in Makiivka. Next season 1996-97 the team played at Avanhard Stadium in Makiivka.

The club served as a training spot for young prospects, but under the management of new Shakhtar youth coaches, the club did not register to play in the Persha Liha for the 2006-07 season, and many of its regulars were cut.

Honours
 Ukrainian Second League - Group C
  Winners (1): 1997/98

League and cup history

Coaches
 1992-1994 Yevhen Korol (Metalurh Kostiantynivka)
 1994-1996 Viktor Nosov
 1996-1997 Viktor Hrachov
 1997-2001 Yevhen Korol
 2001-2002 Mykola Fedorenko
 2002-2003 Viktor Hrachov
 2003-2006 Mykola Fedorenko

See also
 FC Shakhtar Donetsk
 FC Shakhtar Donetsk Reserves and Youth Team

 
Defunct football clubs in Ukraine
Ukrainian reserve football teams
FC Shakhtar Donetsk
Football clubs in Donetsk
Sport in Kostiantynivka
Football clubs in Makiivka
Association football clubs established in 1992
Association football clubs disestablished in 2006
1992 establishments in Ukraine
2006 disestablishments in Ukraine